Commander is a series of supplemental Magic: the Gathering card game products. Its mechanics are derived from a fan-created format known as "Elder Dragon Highlander (EDH)". The official Commander format is "the only sanctioned format maintained by an outside entity" other than Wizards of the Coast.

History 
The original fan-created format, Elder Dragon Highlander (EDH), was developed by Adam Staley in the late 1990s and became a staple of his local play groups in Alaska. Staley's original name was "a tribute to the line 'there can be only one' spoken repeatedly in the 1986 film Highlander" evoking the idea of a battle royale and that there could only be one of a given type of card in a player's deck. The first part of the name referenced the Elder Dragons in the Magic storyline. However, Polygon highlighted that there is some contention on the creative origins of the format as The Duelist also published a multiplayer format called "Elder Legend Dragon Wars" in July 1996 which was shared with the magazine by reader Jesus M. Lopez who claimed he had designed this format. When asked by Polygon, Staley said "I do not remember reading that article. Some things are similar to my version and some are very different".

Sheldon Menery, who was introduced to EDH while stationed at Elmendorf Air Force Base, then developed the format further culminating in his 2004 article outlining the format on the Magic fan site Star City Games which "spread the word about it beyond his circle of judges for the first time". This format differed in several ways such as an expanded deck size and a larger health total. Scott Larabee, the Wizards of the Coast’s Pro Tour manager, played the format for the first time in 2005 with one of Menery's decks at a tournament. In the following year, Menery along with other Pro Tour judges, Gavin Duggan and Duncan McGregor, created a rules committee with an official website.

Larabee went on to advocate the format within Wizards of the Coast which led to the commercial launch of the format in 2011. The EDH name was changed due to intellectual property concerns. , Wizards of the Coast has released a product line containing preconstructed Commander decks. However, the format is still maintained by the Commander Rules Committee which is run independently of Wizards of the Coast. In 2020, Wizards of the Coast released metrics from stores in its Wizards Play Network (WPN) on the total number of participates in Magic events (referred to as Tickets). Per the industry trade ICv2, "the number of unique players attending Commander events per week at WPN stores went from 9,000 in 2018 to 28,000 in 2020. In February 2020, all stores that ran events were averaging 1846 Tickets per year. However, stores that ran Commander events averaged about 2111 Tickets per year which is a 12.6% increase over the stores not running Commander. [...] Commander is clearly a growing format and is driving [organized play] numbers upward [...]. On a final note, for stores that carry singles, Reserved List Commander cards have been on a tear lately. [...] The market price sits at around $600.00 which represents more than a 45% increase in value in only about nine months".

During the COVID-19 pandemic in 2020, Wizards of the Coast partnered on a webcam version of Magic: The Gathering playable online called SpellTable, which allows remote play of the Commander format. In 2021, Dot eSports highlighted that "Commander has become one of the biggest formats in Magic over the past five years, even leading to Wizards of the Coast dubbing 2020 as 'The Year of Commander.' The format is a boon for novice and experienced deckbuilders to craft thematic decks centered around Magic’s over 1,200 Legendary creatures".

In March 2023, Wizards of the Coast officially launched the Oathbreaker format, which originated as a fan-created variation of Commander. It was created by the Weirdcards Charitable Club, a Minnesota-based gaming group, "around 2017" before becoming an officially supported format.

Gameplay

Commander is a format where players construct 100-card decks, with each card (except basic lands) appearing no more than once. The format is primarily played with four players, each with their own deck. Players also choose a legendary creature or Planeswalker to be their "Commander" or "General" (a Planeswalker must be designated as allowed to be used as a Commander), which begins the game in the "Command Zone", from where it can cast directly to the battlefield. If a commander leaves the battlefield, it goes back to the Command Zone and can be cast again for a higher mana cost. Each player's deck is based and built around their Commander's colors.

In addition to the same losing conditions that exist in a normal game of Magic, each player starts the game with 40 life points instead of 20, and a player may lose if he or she is dealt 21 or more total points of combat damage from a single Commander throughout the game. The format "supports two to six players, sometimes more".

Commander also has its own "banned list" of cards, separate from any other format which is controlled by the Commander Rules Committee. This committee also maintains the rules for the format. A list of the recommended banned cards in the format can also be found on the Wizards of the Coast official website.

Variants 

 Duel Commander, also known as French Commander, got its origins from Magic judge Kevin Desprez, who brought the initial idea of EDH to France from the USA, before it spread across Europe and later globally. The game is played by two combatants, each starting with 20 life points, obeys the same rules as a regular Magic game, and has one commander (or commanders with Partner ability) plus 99 (or 98 with Partners) cards in the starting library. The mulligan system is the same as for sanctioned formats, and the deck construction rules follow the same color identity rule as the multiplayer version does. It also has its own ban list and is meant to be more competitive than traditional Commander.
 Magic Online 1v1 Commander is Wizards of the Coast's variant of Commander for Magic: The Gathering Online. The format utilizes a ban list created by Wizards that differs from that of the Rules Committee.
 Brawl is Wizards of the Coast's Commander variant which launched in 2018. Brawl utilizes all cards that are currently legal in Standard and has a rotation schedule similar to that of Standard. While similar to traditional Commander, deck size is limited to 60 cards and each player starts with 30 life. The format is commonly played as a sanctioned event on Magic: The Gathering Online and on MTG Arena. It was a highly requested addition to MTG Arena but the "variant never took off on paper". The physical format was not well-received by the players due to a "shortage of preconstructed decks" and the resale price of individual cards.
 Pauper Commander is a variant in which each card in the deck must be Pauper legal (had to be printed or released online at one point with a Common rarity) and the Commander must be any creature (legendary or not) that was printed or released online at least one time at Uncommon rarity. On this variation, commander damage is 16 to 18 and starting life is 30 points.
 Oathbreaker is an official variant which launched in 2023. This format is free-for-all multiplayer with three to five players who each start with 20 life; the winner is the last standing player. Each player builds a 58-card singleton deck along with selecting an "Oathbreaker (a planeswalker card) and a Signature Spell (an instant or sorcery) that matches the color identity of the Oathbreaker" to go with the deck. "The Oathbreaker and the Signature Spell start in the command zone at the beginning of each game, and can be can during the game at their normal costs, plus an additional two mana for each time they have been cast. Both of these cards return to the command zone if they would go to the graveyard".

Commander sets

2011
Magic: The Gathering Commander was released on June 17, 2011. It consisted of five preconstructed decks, each containing three foil oversized legendary creature cards. This set is notable in that it was the first set printed outside of the normal booster pack expansions to have functionally new cards. The set introduced 51 new cards made specifically for multi-player games.

Each deck is built around a new legendary creature and a distinct mechanical theme. In addition to the intended Commander, they include two other new legendary creatures.
 Heavenly Inferno (white/black/red, commanded by ) features a variety of Angels, Demons, and Dragons that Kaalia can put directly into play, and numerous creature destruction effects.
 Mirror Mastery (blue/red/green, commanded by ) uses large amounts of mana acceleration to cast powerful spells and creatures for Riku to copy.
 Counterpunch (black/green/white, commanded by ) is constructed around the dual themes of creature tokens and +1/+1 counters.
 Political Puppets (red/white/blue, commanded by ) uses Zedruu to gain cards and life while earning good will and turning opponents against each other.
 Devour for Power (green/blue/black, commanded by ) fills graveyards with creatures in order to power up The Mimeoplasm and other synergistic cards.

2012
Commander's Arsenal is a set with 18 premium foil cards, 10 oversized premium foil cards, card sleeves, a life counter, and tokens for keeping track of in-game effects. The set was released on November 2, 2012. Each card in the set was the first edition of that card to receive premium foil treatment, the first to be printed in the modern frame, and/or received special art.

2013
Commander 2013 was released on November 1, 2013. It introduced five new pre-constructed decks, each built around one of the three-colored "shards". 51 new cards were printed for Commander 2013, including five that introduced the mechanic Tempting offer, which allows opponents to duplicate the card's effect but at the cost of granting its controller a larger effect. Each of the Commanders interacts with the Command Zone, either offering a benefit for playing the commander repeatedly or giving the player a benefit while remaining in the Command Zone.

Evasive Maneuvers (green/white/blue, commanded by ) has a tap/untap and exile-and-return theme.
Eternal Bargain (white/blue/black, commanded by ) features the two themes of life gain and artifacts.
Mind Seize (blue/black/red, commanded by ) features an instant and sorcery theme alongside cards that punish opponents for drawing. 
Power Hungry (black/red/green, commanded by ) features a creature token theme, sacrificing them for a benefit.
Nature of the Beast (red/green/white, commanded by ) features a creature token theme.

2014
Commander 2014 was released on November 7, 2014. It introduced five new pre-constructed decks, each built around one of the five colors. 61 new cards were printed for Commander 2014, including five that introduced the Lieutenant mechanic, which gives a bonus for the creature if you also control your Commander, and the first ever Planeswalkers that can be your Commander.

Forged In Stone (white, commanded by ) with an equipment theme.
Peer Through Time (blue, commanded by )
Sworn To Darkness (black, commanded by 
Built From Scratch (red, commanded by ) themed around artifacts.
Guided By Nature (green, commanded by ) themed around elves.

2015
Commander 2015 was released on November 10, 2015. It introduced five new pre-constructed decks, built around "enemy" two-color combinations. 55 new cards were printed, including new commanders that utilized "experience counters" to grow more powerful as the game progressed. Other new cards introduced the Myriad mechanic, which allowed a single creature to attack every opponent simultaneously.
Call the Spirits (white/black, commanded by ) themed around enchantments.
Seize Control (blue/red, commanded by ) themed around instants and sorceries.
Plunder the Graves (black/green, commanded by ) themed around sacrificing creatures and returning creatures from the graveyard.
Wade into Battle (red/white, commanded by ) themed around giants.
Swell the Host (green/blue, commanded by ) themed around creating multiple smaller creatures and increasing their power.

2016
Commander 2016 was released on November 11, 2016. It introduced five new pre-constructed decks, built around four-color combinations. The new "Partner" mechanic allows two legendary creatures, both with Partner, to serve as your commander. 56 new cards were printed, including the first 4-color legendary creatures.
Entropic Uprising (blue/black/red/green, commanded by ) with a "windmill" theme that gains benefits from opponents drawing or discarding cards.
Open Hostility (black/red/green/white, commanded by ) with a focus on combat damage.
Stalwart Unity (red/green/white/blue, commanded by ) with a focus on "Group Hug" effects that benefit all players and encourage playing politics with the other players.
Breed Lethality (green/white/blue/black, commanded by ) with a focus on +1/+1 counters and multiplying those counters.
Invent Superiority (white/blue/black/red, commanded by ) with a focus on artifacts.

2017
Commander Anthology was released on June 9, 2017. It is a boxed re-release of four pre-constructed decks, one from each of the first four years of Commander sets.
 Heavenly Inferno (2011) (white/black/red, commanded by )
Evasive Maneuvers (2013) (green/white/blue, commanded by )
Guided By Nature (2014) (green, commanded by )
Plunder the Graves (2015) (black/green, commanded by )
Commander 2017 was released on August 25, 2017. Starting with Commander 2017, Commander sets are reduced from five to four preconstructed theme decks (without reducing the number of new cards) and will be built around themes instead of focusing on color combinations. Commander 17 is a tribal set, with each deck focusing on one creature type. The new "Eminence" mechanic grants a benefit while a Commander is in play or in the command zone, with each commander having an additional effect while they are on the battlefield.
 Draconic Domination  (all five colors, commanded by ) a dragon deck. 
 Feline Ferocity  (green/white, commanded by ) a Cat deck, with an equipment theme that encourages improving a single creature at a time.
 Vampiric Bloodlust  (red/white/black, commanded by ) a vampire deck.
 Arcane Wizardry (blue/black/red, commanded by ) a wizard deck.

2018 
Commander Anthology Volume 2 was released on June 8, 2018. Like the previous year's Commander Anthology, Volume 2 was a boxed re-release of four pre-constructed decks. It contains the following decks:
Devour for Power (2011) (green/blue/black, commanded by )
Built from Scratch (2014) (red, commanded by )
Wade into Battle (2015) (red/white, commanded by )
Breed Lethality (2016) (green/white/blue/black, commanded by )
Commander 2018 was announced on February 14, 2018 for release on August 10, 2018. It sees the return of Planeswalkers as Commanders. It contains the following decks:

 Exquisite Invention (blue/red, commanded by ) an artifact deck that produces artifact tokens.
 Subjective Reality (white/blue/black, commanded by ) with a theme of controlling the top card of the deck.
 Nature's Vengeance (black/red/green, commanded by ) a land/landfall themed deck.
 Adaptive Enchantment (white/blue/green, commanded by ) an enchantment themed deck.

2019 
Commander 2019 was announced on February 21, 2019 for release on August 23, 2019. It contains the following decks:
 Faceless Menace (blue/green/black, commanded by ) with the overarching theme of playing face-down 'Morph' creatures and benefiting of playing creatures.
 Mystic Intellect (red/blue/white, commanded by ) a spell-heavy deck focused on casting spells multiple times, using 'Flashback' to cast spells again from the graveyard.
 Primal Genesis (red/green/white, commanded by ) a token deck aiming to create a bunch of token creatures and 'Populate' them.
 Merciless Rage (red/black, commanded by ) Designed around discarding cards and benefiting of this by employing the 'Madness' keyword for value.

2020 
Commander 2020 was released on May 15, 2020. It contains the following decks:
 Timeless Wisdom (blue/red/white, commanded by ) 
 Symbiotic Swarm (white/black/green, commanded by ) a creature deck focusing on Ability Counters.
 Enhanced Evolution (black/green/blue, commanded by ) a creature deck based on the new Mutate Ability.
 Arcane Maelstrom (green/blue/red, commanded by )
 Ruthless Regiment (red/white/black, commanded by )
Commander Zendikar Rising were released on September 25, 2020. This was the first Commander Deck set to change from the annual 4-5 deck sets to 2 deck sets for each major expansion release. It contains the following decks:
 Land's Wrath (green/white/red, commanded by ) a landfall deck.
 Sneak Attack (blue/black, commanded by ) a rogues deck.
Commander Legends Commander Decks were released on November 20, 2020. It contains the following decks:
 Arm For Battle (white/red, commanded by ) an equipment/aura deck.
 Reap The Tides (blue/green, commanded by ) a sea-themed landfall deck.

2021 
Commander Kaldheim were released on February 5, 2021. It corresponded with the Kaldheim set. It contains the following decks:
 Elven Empire (green/black, commanded by ) an elf deck.
 Phantom Premonition (white/blue, commanded by ) a spirit deck.
Commander 2021 was released on April 23, 2021. It corresponded with the Strixhaven: School of Mages set. It contains the following decks:
 Silverquill Statement (white/black, commanded by ), a deck with a politics and aggro theme.
 Prismari Performance (blue/red, commanded by ) a deck with an instants and sorceries theme.
 Witherbloom Witchcraft (black/green, commanded by ) a deck with a lifegain theme.
 Lorehold Legacies (red/white, commanded by ) a deck with an artifacts / graveyard theme.
 Quantum Quandrix (green/blue, commanded by ) a deck with a tokens and +1/+1 counters theme
Adventures in the Forgotten Realms Commander was released on July 23, 2021. It corresponded with the Dungeons & Dragons: Adventures in the Forgotten Realms set. It contains the following decks:

 Aura of Courage (green/white/blue, commanded by ) a deck with an aura/equipment theme.
 Draconic Rage (red/green, commanded by ) a deck with a dragon tribal and ramp theme.
 Dungeons of Death (white/blue/black, commanded by ) a midrange deck focusing on the dungeon mechanic.
 Planar Portal (black/red, commanded by ) a tempo deck that aims to cast spells from exile.
Innistrad: Midnight Hunt Commander was released on September 24, 2021. It corresponded with the Innistrad: Midnight Hunt set. It contains the following decks:

 Coven Counters (green/white, commanded by ) a deck with a focus on going wide with humans and +1/+1 counters.
 Undead Unleashed (blue/black, commanded by ) a control deck with zombie tribal support.

Innistrad: Crimson Vow Commander was released on November 19, 2021. It corresponded with the Innistrad: Crimson Vow set. It contains the following decks:

 Spirit Squadron (white/blue, commanded by ) a deck with a spirit tribal theme.
 Vampiric Bloodline (black/red, commanded by ) an aggro deck that gets card advantage with Blood tokens.

2022 
Kamigawa: Neon Dynasty Commander was released on February 18, 2022. It corresponds with the Kamigawa: Neon Dynasty set. It contains the following decks: 

Buckle Up (white/blue, commanded by ) a deck with a vehicle theme.
Upgrades Unleashed (red/green, commanded by ) a deck with a theme of modifying creatures via equipment, counters, and auras.

Streets of New Capenna Commander was released on April 29, 2022. It corresponds with the Streets of New Capenna set. Notably, this is a departure from previous years; while Commander 2020 and Commander 2021 were themed around specific regular Magic sets, they were still branded as general Commander products, whereas this set is 2022's primary Commander product and still a subset of Streets of New Capenna. It contains the following decks:

Obscura Operation (white/black/blue, commanded by ), a deck themed around card draw and combat.
Maestros Massacre (blue/black/red, commanded by ), a deck that uses creatures as a resource to cast powerful spells.
Riveteers Rampage (black/red/green, commanded by ), a deck with powerful creatures that it casts for a reduced cost.
Cabaretti Cacophony (white/red/green, commanded by ), a deck focused on creature tokens and pitting opponents against one another.
Bedecked Brokers (white/blue/green, commanded by ), a deck focused on different types of counters, especially +1/+1 counters.
Battle for Baldur's Gate Commander was released on June 10, 2022. It corresponds with the Battle for Baldur's Gate set, which is thematically tied to the world of Dungeons and Dragons. It contains the following decks:
Party Time (white/black, commanded by ), a deck themed around the party mechanic.
Mind Flayarrrs (blue/black, commanded by ), a deck that utilizes Horror creatures and the mill mechanic.
Draconic Dissent (blue/red, commanded by ), a deck with Dragon synergies.
Exit From Exile (red/green, commanded by ), a deck focused on playing spells and lands from exile.
Dominaria United Commander was released on September 9, 2022. It corresponds with the Dominaria United set. It contains the following decks:
Painbow (all five colors, commanded by )
Legends' Legacy (white/black/red, commanded by )
Warhammer 40,000 Commander was released on October 8, 2022. This is a standalone product, so isn't tied to any specific Magic set. However, it is a part of Universes Beyond, a sub-brand of MTG, which combines Magic's gameplay with worlds and characters from other intellectual properties. In this case, it's a collaboration with Warhammer 40,000. It contains the following decks:
The Ruinous Powers (blue/black/red, commanded by ) a deck with counterspells.
Tyranid Swarm (blue/red/green, commanded by ) a deck focused on token creatures an +1 counters.
Forces of the Imperium (white/blue/black, commanded by ) a deck with powerful creatures and token creature generators.
Necron Dynasties (black, commanded by ) a deck heavy in artifact creatures and artifacts. 
The Brothers' War Commander was released on November 18, 2022. It corresponds with The Brothers' War set. It contains the following decks:
Urza's Iron Alliance (white/blue/black, commanded by ) a token artifact deck.
Mishra's Burnished Banner (blue/black/red, commanded by ) an artifact deck based on artifact copy.
Starter Commander Decks were released on December 2, 2022. It is a stanandalo product meant as an entry point for new players who want to start playing Commander. These decks contained only reprints. The Brothers' War set. It contains the following decks:
First Flight (white/blue, commanded by ) a control deck that utilizes creatures with flying. 
Grave Danger (blue/black, commanded by ) a Zombie tribal deck with graveyard synergies.
Chaos Incarnate (black/red, commanded by ) a deck with less focused theme, it has various cards that deal damage and force opponents to make difficult choices.
Draconic Destruction (red/green, commanded by ) a Dragon tribal deck.
Token Triumph (green/white, commanded by ) a token deck.

2023 
Phyrexia: All Will Be One Commander was released on February 10, 2023. It corresponds with the Phyrexia: All Will Be One set. It contains the following decks:
Corrupting Influence (white/black/green, commanded by ) a deck focused on poison counters.
Rebellion Rising (white/red, commanded by ) a deck focused on creating and buffing tokens.

Reception 
Charlie Hall, for Polygon, commented in 2020 that "many Magic players see creating a Commander deck as the ultimate expression of a player’s skill, and of their ability to use their personal collection of cards to its fullest. The Commander format embodies the game’s reputation for competition, but also for storytelling". Jason Coles, for Dicebreaker, wrote that Commander is "possibly the most popular format in all of Magic: The Gathering [...]. It’s a fun format that generally features groups of up to four players duking it out and trying to keep each other in check".

Jan Švelch, in the academic journal Analog Game Studies, wrote that "the popular Commander format has been receiving yearly expansions since 2011 when the first official Commander pre-constructed decks were released. Many of these emergent formats address the more controversial aspects of the official and sanctioned Magic formats [...]. The interactions between players and developers often follow the logic of cultural convergence with popular community formats receiving official expansions. Creation of such community formats and their consequent commercialization by publishers can also be seen as a manifestation of fan labor in which fans create value which is later capitalized on by the official producers".

In 2013, Steve Heisler, for The A.V. Club, wrote that "EDH is dorky and fun. [...] But ironically, EDH is in danger of transforming into the same kind of serious, streamlined structure that its original creators wanted to avoid". Heisler was concerned that Wizards of the Coast's expansion into the casual Magic scene would recreate issues of the competitive format such as players only using the most optimal deck; additionally, he commented that the preconstructed decks add a new metagame to the format. Heisler highlighted "now there are cards created just for Commander that are inarguably better than their counterparts, and their inclusion in the pre-made decks implies you really should think about picking them up. [...] But if you’re not going to use these optimal cards, you’d better get ready to play against them. [...] The metagame of Commander has largely been dictated by the collector marketplace, which itself is largely dictated by a card’s demand in non-Commander settings". Heisler stated that Wizards of the Coast began to add cards to Commander decks that are more useful in the Legacy format leading to collectors buying the preconstructed decks for a single card which then led to the price of the Commander decks increasing. Heisler wrote, "by feeding Commander product into the collector-driven sludge pot, and by emphasizing the inclusion of cards that are absolutely better than others, Wizards and the Magic collector community threaten to make this format just like all the others".

In 2021, Xavier Johnson, for Dot eSports, highlighted that deck building thrives in Commander's more casual format. Johnson wrote, "Commander is a casual Constructed format that emphasizes the importance of individual playgroups setting expectations rather than adherence to a strict set of rules and a win-at-all-costs mentality. This underlying philosophy influences how players craft their Commander decks, since many players view deckbuilding as a form of self expression or a way to make use of their collections. [...] A quirk of Commander deckbuilding is the social contract and the format’s focus on a fun, communal experience rather than wins and losses. This leads to certain cards being generally shunned by many playgroups". Since there is so much variety between playgroups and the focus is on the social experience, there isn't the same adherence to the metagame as there is in other formats such as Standard and Modern; optimized cards might not be used in a local playgroup because these cards are "frustrating to play against".

References

External links
Commander Product Info
Commander site

Official Commander rules
Cards Currently Banned in Commander
Official 1v1 Commander Website

Card games introduced in 2011
Magic: The Gathering sets